is a 1935 black and white Japanese comedy film directed by Sadao Yamanaka and starring Denjirō Ōkōchi.

Cast
 Denjirō Ōkōchi: Tange Sazen
 Kiyozo: Ofuji
 Kunitaro Sawamura: Genzaburo Yagyu
 Reisaburo Yamamoto: Yokichi
 Minoru Takase: Shigeju
 Ranko Hanai: Ogino

Story 
A man gives an old pot to his brother, not realizing there is a treasure map inside. His sister-in-law sells the pot to a junk dealer, who in turn sells it to a boy named Yasu. A cast of colorful characters are all looking for this pot, and when the child runs away after being chided by Ogino, everyone goes after him. The end, however, is covered in disappointment - the hope of each character that their world will get better is each individually crushed, in a humorous manner.

Reception 
Mark Schilling of The Japan Times noted that the film was "universally considered the best of all the Tange Sazen lot."

The Japanese filmmaker Akira Kurosawa cited this movie as one of his 100 favorite films.

References

External links
 
 

1935 films
Japanese black-and-white films
Films directed by Sadao Yamanaka
Nikkatsu films
Japanese comedy films
1935 comedy films
Films set in Edo
Films about orphans